Waco is a city in Haralson County, Georgia, United States, located near the Alabama state line. The population was 516 at the 2010 census, up from 469 at the 2000 census.

History
The Georgia General Assembly incorporated Waco in 1885. Waco is a name derived from the Muskogean language meaning "heron".

Geography

Waco is bordered to the south and east by the city of Bremen. U.S. Route 78 passes through the center of town, leading east  to the center of Bremen and northwest  to Tallapoosa. Interstate 20 forms the southern border of Waco and provides access from Exit 9 (Atlantic Avenue). I-20 leads east  to Atlanta and west  to Birmingham, Alabama.

Demographics

2020 census

As of the 2020 United States census, there were 536 people, 200 households, and 151 families residing in the city.

2000 census
As of the census of 2000, there were 469 people, 189 households, and 130 families residing in the city. The racial makeup of the city was 97.01% White, 1.49% African American, 0.43% Native American, 0.85% from other races, and 0.21% from two or more races.

There were 189 households, out of which 28.6% had children under the age of 18 living with them, 56.1% were married couples living together, 8.5% had a female householder with no husband present, and 30.7% were non-families. 24.9% of all households were made up of individuals, and 9.0% had someone living alone who was 65 years of age or older.  The average household size was 2.48 and the average family size was 2.99.

In the city, the population was spread out, with 24.3% under the age of 18, 7.7% from 18 to 24, 28.1% from 25 to 44, 28.8% from 45 to 64, and 11.1% who were 65 years of age or older.  The median age was 35 years. For every 100 females, there were 115.1 males.  For every 100 females age 18 and over, there were 101.7 males.

The median income for a household in the city was $31,667, and the median income for a family was $40,417. Males had a median income of $29,000 versus $21,094 for females. The per capita income for the city was $16,076.  About 9.5% of families and 13.5% of the population were below the poverty line, including 22.0% of those under age 18 and 10.8% of those age 65 or over.

References

External links
City of Waco official website

Cities in Georgia (U.S. state)
Cities in Haralson County, Georgia